Pinnoctopus is a genus of octopuses in the family Octopodidae. It is of doubtful validity.

Species
 Pinnoctopus cordiformis (Quoy and Gaimard, 1832. nomen dubium
 Pinnoctopus kermadecensis (Berry, 1914)

Taxonomic note
ITIS treats Pinnoctopus as a synonym of Octopus Cuvier, 1797. While the World Register of Marine Species treats it as a nomen dubium, has P. cordiformis as a species of doubtful validity and assigns P. kermadecensis to Octopus.

References

External links

 

Octopodidae
Cephalopod genera